Maladjusted is the sixth studio album by English singer Morrissey, released on 11 August 1997 by Island Records.

On release, the album received a lukewarm reception from fans and critics alike, and was Morrissey's last studio album for seven years, until 2004's You Are the Quarry.

Content
Maladjusted was Morrissey's attempt to integrate the torch songs that he experimented with on Vauxhall and I with the indie rock of his earlier career. In addition to "Alma Matters", the tracks "Trouble Loves Me", "Ammunition" and "Wide to Receive" stand out as reminiscent of the Vauxhall and I era.

The album caused a small amount of controversy over what was to be the penultimate track. Entitled "Sorrow Will Come in the End", it featured Morrissey intoning, rather than singing, over a backing of manic strings and the beat of a judge's gavel. The song is clearly about the Mike Joyce royalties dispute, and lyrically takes the form of, essentially, an extended threatening message to him and his representatives. "Don't close your eyes/Don't ever close your eyes/A man who slits throats/Has time on his hands/And I'm gonna get you". Island Records, Morrissey's label at the time, dropped the track from UK versions of the album for fear of libel action. Joyce, for his part, said of the song, "I just found it funny. If Lemmy had written it, I might be concerned."

On the inside sleeve of the LP is printed "John Bindon 1943–1993", a reference to the English actor and bodyguard who had close links with the London underworld.

Release
Morrissey released "Alma Matters" on 21 July 1997 to support the album. The song premiered on the KROQ-FM Jed the Fish show on 4 July 1997.

Maladjusted was released on 11 August 1997 by record label Island. The follow-up singles "Roy's Keen" and "Satan Rejected My Soul" peaked at numbers 42 and 39, respectively.

Island Records released a remastered and redesigned version of Maladjusted on 4 May 2009. It included a new album cover and track listing, several rare B-sides and the first UK release of "Sorrow Will Come in the End". However, two songs ("Roy's Keen" and "Papa Jack") were left off the new track list. In the initial press release, "Ambitious Outsiders" was incorrectly listed as "Ambitious Lovers". It was released on the Polydor label.

Critical reception

Maladjusted received a mixed-to-unfavourable response from critics.

Matt Hendrickson of Rolling Stone wrote, "despite his predictability, Maladjusted is Morrissey's strongest musical effort since his 1988 solo debut, Viva Hate."

Track listing

Personnel
Credits are adapted from the Maladjusted liner notes.
Morrissey – vocals
Alain Whyte – guitar; piano; backing vocals
Boz Boorer – clarinet, guitar
Jonny Bridgwood – bass guitar
Spencer Cobrin  drums
Steve Lillywhite – producer

Charts

References

External links

Morrissey albums
1997 albums
Albums produced by Steve Lillywhite